El Camino High School may refer to the following schools in California, United States:

 El Camino High School (Norwalk) in Norwalk
 El Camino High School (Oceanside, California)
 El Camino High School (Rohnert Park) in Rohnert Park
 El Camino High School (Salinas) in Salinas
 El Camino High School (South San Francisco) in South San Francisco
 El Camino High School (Ventura) in Ventura
 El Camino High School (Whittier) in Whittier

It may also refer to:
 El Camino Fundamental High School in Sacramento
 El Camino Real Senior High School in Woodland Hills, Los Angeles
 El Camino Real High School (Placentia) in Placentia